The Gadsden Eagles were a Minor League Baseball team based in Gadsden, Alabama, that played in the Georgia–Alabama League from 1928–1929.

External links
Baseball Reference

Baseball teams established in 1928
Baseball teams disestablished in 1929
Defunct minor league baseball teams
Professional baseball teams in Alabama
Defunct Georgia-Alabama League teams
1928 establishments in Alabama
1929 disestablishments in Alabama
Defunct baseball teams in Alabama